In heraldry, crows and ravens are not distinguished from each other. A crow or raven is usually depicted with hairy feathers and closed wings.
A crow speaking will have its mouth agape or open as if it were speaking. Crows may also be called corbies, as in the canting arms of Corbet, c. 1312.

The Cornish chough is also depicted in heraldry, but is only distinguishable if proper, meaning depicted as black with red beak and feet. For canting purposes, the Cornish chough is sometimes called a beckit.
On the coat of arms of County Dublin and Fingal in Ireland, the crow was adapted from the raven banner of the Vikings, who had settled in the area. Lisbon, the capital of Portugal, as well as the cities of Wagga Wagga, Australia and Moss, Norway have crows in their coats-of-arms.

The Hungarian family Hunyadi also used the raven in their coats of arms. Matthias Corvinus of Hungary named his famous library (Bibliotheca Corviniana) after the bird. It might have inspired the uniform and name of his mercenary army (Black Army of Hungary), and his illegitimate son, János Corvinus also wore the bird's name.

The Corbet (Corbel, Corby, Corbe) family from the Channel Islands are also names having been corrupted over time from the Latin word corvus, for raven

See also

Raven banner

References

Heraldic birds